The 2022 Texas Tech Red Raiders football team represented Texas Tech University during the 2022 NCAA Division I FBS football season. The Red Raiders played their home games at Jones AT&T Stadium and Cody Campbell Field in Lubbock, Texas, and competed in the Big 12 Conference. They were led by first-year head coach Joey McGuire.

The Red Raiders finished the regular season 7–5, 5–4 in Big 12 play, for the program's first winning conference record since 2009. Additionally, Texas Tech defeated Texas and Oklahoma in the same season for the first time in program history. The Red Raiders were invited to the Texas Bowl, defeating Ole Miss 42–25. Defensive lineman Tyree Wilson was named All-Big 12 First Team and defensive back Malik Dunlap was named All-Big 12 Second Team.

Previous season

The 2021 team finished the regular season with an overall record of 6–6 and a Big 12 record of 3–6, finishing in ninth place in the conference. The team was invited to the Liberty Bowl, playing against Mississippi State; this was the program's first bowl game since the 2017 Birmingham Bowl. The Red Raiders won the Liberty Bowl, 34–7, finishing the season with an overall record of 7–6 for the program's first winning season since 2015.

Offseason

Coaching changes
Following a 24–25 loss to Kansas State in the eighth week of the 2021 season, head coach Matt Wells was fired on October 25. Offensive coordinator and quarterbacks coach Sonny Cumbie was named interim head coach for the rest of the 2021 season. On November 8, Joey McGuire was hired as the Red Raider’s new head coach, having previously been the associate head coach and outside linebackers coach for the Baylor Bears. On November 24, McGuire announced that he would be retaining Cumbie as offensive coordinator and quarterbacks coach. However, Cumbie was hired as the head coach at Louisiana Tech University on November 30. Running backs coach DeAndre Smith, father of quarterback Donovan Smith, was retained by McGuire. On December 5, Virginia Tech announced that it had hired co-defensive coordinator Derek Jones. The following day it was announced that head defensive coordinator Keith Patterson had been hired as the head coach at Abilene Christian. DeAndre Smith was later hired as the New York Giants' running backs coach on February 11, 2022.

Recruiting class
References:

|}

Transfers
Outgoing

Incoming

Preseason

Big 12 media poll
The preseason poll was released on July 7, 2022.

Award watch lists
Listed in the order that they were released

Personnel

Schedule
Texas Tech and the Big 12 announced the 2022 football schedule on December 1, 2021.

Schedule Source:

Game summaries

Murray State

Tyler Shough started at quarterback for the Red Raiders but exited the game at the end of the first quarter due to a possible injury. Donovan Smith then came in at quarterback and quickly scored with a 30-yard pass to Jerand Bradley. Murray State's starting quarterback, D. J. Williams, would also be injured, as his right leg gave out on a sack on the last play of the first half. With the Red Raiders up 56–10, Smith exited the game midway through the third quarter and was relieved by Behren Morton. The three Texas Tech quarterbacks went for a combined 27/36 for 472 yards, 6 touchdowns, and one interception.

No. 25 Houston

This was the Red Raiders' first win over a ranked opponent since 2019 and first win over a ranked non-conference opponent since 1989.

at No. 16 NC State

No. 22 Texas

This was Texas Tech's first win over Texas in Lubbock since 2008. Texas Tech narrowed the Longhorns' lead in the all-time series to 16 wins against 52 losses in the 68-game in-state rivalry.

Although the Red Raiders held a 14-10 lead early in the second quarter, they trailed 24-14 at halftime. Trailing 31-24 after three quarters, Texas Tech tied the game on a Donavan Smith pass to Baylor Cupp, and then took a 34-31 lead late in the 4th quarter on a Trey Wolff 45-yard field goal. The Red Raiders appeared to have the game in hand as the Longhorns got the ball with just 21 seconds left in the 4th quarter at the Tech 29-yard line. But the Longhorns drove 46 yards in three plays and got a long field goal as time ran out to force overtime. In overtime, the Red Raiders won the coin toss and elected to play on defense first. The strategy paid off when linebacker Krishon Merriweather's hard hit on all-conference tailback Bijon Robinson forced a fumble that was recovered by defensive back Reggie Pierson Jr.  Texas Tech's SaRodorick Thompson gained 17 yards on Tech's first offensive play in overtime, setting up Trey Wolff's game-winning field goal.

at No. 25 Kansas State

at No. 7 Oklahoma State

West Virginia

Baylor

at No. 7 TCU

The Horned Frogs entered the game with an 8-0 record and a top-10 ranking. TCU took an early 7-0 lead on a long punt return, but starting quarterback Behren Morton pulled Tech even at 7-7 with a 47-yard touchdown pass to Jerand Bradley. Trey Wolff added a short field goal to put Texas Tech up 10-7, but Morton suffered a lower body injury in the second quarter. He was replaced by Tyler Shough.

Tech's defense held the Horned Frogs scoreless in the third, with Jaylon Hutchings making a key sack against TCU's Max Duggan on a 4th-down play deep in Tech territory. Shough's 33-yard touchdown pass to J.J. Sparkman gave the Red Raiders a 17-13 lead going into the 4th quarter, but the Horned Frogs were able to drive 81 yards to retake the lead. Texas Tech, which committed just 6 penalties in the game, was flagged three times on TCU's go-ahead drive. The drive was extended in part by a blown call on a facemask penalty when Tech's Tyree Wilson sacked TCU's Max Duggan early in the drive deep in TCU territory. The Horned Frogs added two more Max Duggan touchdown passes in the fourth quarter to put the game away. Shough scored on a touchdown run late in the fourth quarter with the game out of reach as Tech fell to 4-5 for the season.

Kansas

at Iowa State

Oklahoma

This was Texas Tech's first win over Oklahoma since 2011.

vs. Ole Miss (Texas Bowl)

Statistics

Scoring
Scores against non-conference opponents

Scores against the Big 12

Scores against all opponents

Offense

Special teams

Weekly Awards
 Big 12 Offensive Player of the Week
Donovan Smith (week 2 vs. Houston)

 Big 12 Defensive Player of the Week
Reggie Pearson (week 4 vs. Texas)

 Big 12 Special Teams Player of the Week
Trey Wolff (week 4 vs. Texas)
Trey Wolff (week 11 vs. Kansas)
Trey Wolff (week 13 vs. Oklahoma)

 Big 12 Newcomer of the Week
Behren Morton (week 8 vs. West Virginia)

 Earl Campbell Tyler Rose Award National Player of the Week
Donovan Smith (week 4 vs. Texas)

References

Texas Tech
Texas Tech Red Raiders football seasons
Texas Bowl champion seasons
Texas Tech Red Raiders football